Heinrich Moritz Max Freiherr von Beschwitz (Otzdorf, 23 December 1859 – Schloss Arnsdorf, 22 July 1944), Lord of Arnsdorf with Gersdorf (now part of Ottendorf-Okrilla) and Ottendorf in the Kingdom of Saxony, was a German Military and Nobleman, son of Moritz Wilhelm Wolf Freiherr von Beschwitz and his wife Alexandra von Hesse.

Career
He was a Gentleman of the Bedchamber of the King of Saxony, Captain of Cavalry and a Knight of the Order of St. John.

Marriage and children
He married in Dresden on 27 January 1885 Alexandra Emilie Caroline Eugenie Henriette Adele Gräfin Zedtwitz von Moraván und Duppau (Schloss Duppau, 15 September 1861 – Schloss Arnsdorf, 26 July 1945), daughter of Curt Franz Wenzel Christoph Erdmann Graf Zedtwitz von Moraván und Duppau and wife Caroline Adelheid Ernestine von Schönberg, and had issue, among whom a son Christoph Moritz Max Freiherr von Beschwitz.

References

1859 births
1944 deaths
Barons of Germany